Robert F. Teplitz (born December 20, 1970) is an American lawyer and politician who served as a Democratic member of the Pennsylvania State Senate for the 15th district, based in the state capital of Harrisburg, from 2013 to 2016. He was the first Democrat to represent this district since 1941, and only the second Democrat to win the seat since 1875.

Early life and education
Teplitz was born December 20, 1970 in Miami, Florida. He was raised in Central Pennsylvania and graduated from Central Dauphin High School, Franklin & Marshall College and Cornell Law School.

Career
Prior to being elected to the State Senate in 2012, Teplitz served as an adviser to Pennsylvania Auditor General Jack Wagner. He was defeated by John DiSanto in the 2016 election. After his term expired, he accepted a job as a policy adviser to the Pennsylvania Senate Democratic Caucus.

References

External links
State Senator Rob Teplitz official caucus website
Pennsylvania Senate: Rob Teplitz (D) official PA Senate website
Rob Teplitz for State Senate campaign website

1970 births
20th-century American lawyers
21st-century American lawyers
21st-century American politicians
Cornell Law School alumni
Franklin & Marshall College alumni
Jewish American state legislators in Pennsylvania
Living people
Pennsylvania lawyers
Democratic Party Pennsylvania state senators
People from Dauphin County, Pennsylvania
Politicians from Miami
21st-century American Jews